Bernadette Wegenstein (born 1969) is a Research Professor and director of the Center for Advanced Media Studies at Johns Hopkins University. She has written books on media theory including Getting Under the Skin: Body and Media Theory, The Cosmetic Gaze: Body Modification and the Construction of Beauty.

Biography 

She received a doctorate from University of Vienna in 1998 with a thesis "Die Darstellung von Aids in den Medien : semio-linguistische Analyse und Interpretation" ("The portrayal of AIDS in the media: linguistic semiotic analysis and interpretation")  Copies of the thesis are held in WorldCat libraries. she subsequently became an Assistant Professor at the University of Buffalo. She is currently a Research Professor at the Johns Hopkins University, where she also directs the Center for Advanced Media Studies.

Bernadette produced and directed her first documentary Made Over in America (Icarusfilms) about the television makeover show The Swan (TV series) in 2007. Her second film, See You Soon Again, which she co-directed with the Austrian director and producer Lukas Stepanik (The Cinema Guild, 2012) is a portrait of Viennese Holocaust survivor Leo Bretholz in his efforts to pass on his story of survival to the Baltimore youth. She is currently in post-production with two feature documentaries: The Good Breast (working title), a feature documentary that interweaves the intimate stories of three breast cancer patients with the history and mythology of the breast. The film brings together her expertise on the history of the body and makeover culture with her passion for the character-driven cinéma vérité genre; and the documentary short, Devoti Tutti, is a neo-realist exploration of the little known breast cancer Saint Agatha of Sicily who was martyrized by her breast sacrifice in 251 AD. The film is an immersion into the devotional culture around the yearly celebration of Saint Agatha in Catania, Sicily.

In her book  The Cosmetic Gaze she analyzes the body as a medium of the gaze. This medium is best exemplified in Reality TV makeover shows, such as The Swan where contestants are made over and revealed with drastic changes.

Bibliography

Books 
  According to WorldCat, the book is held in  284 libraries. 
Review:  
  According to WorldCat, the book is held in  964 libraries 
Review: 
Review:

Book chapters

Journal articles

References 

1969 births
Austrian women academics
Johns Hopkins University faculty
Living people
University at Buffalo faculty
University of Vienna alumni